Francesco Pieri (3 June 1902, Acquapendente - 15 May 1961, Acquapendente) was an Italian Roman Catholic bishop. From 1941 to his death he was bishop of Orvieto.

References

1902 births
1961 deaths
20th-century Italian Roman Catholic bishops
Bishops of Orvieto
People from the Province of Viterbo